The 2018 Maryland gubernatorial election was held on November 6, 2018. The date included the election of the governor, lieutenant governor, and all members of the Maryland General Assembly. Incumbent governor Larry Hogan and Lieutenant Governor Boyd Rutherford, both Republicans, were reelected to a second term against Democrat Ben Jealous, the former NAACP CEO, and his running mate Susan Turnbull. Hogan thus became the second Republican governor of Maryland to win reelection, and the first since 1954. This was the first Maryland gubernatorial election in which both major party candidates received over one million votes.

This is the last time that a Republican won a statewide election in Maryland.

Background
At the presidential level, Maryland is a staunchly Democratic state due to the large amount of Democratic voters in the Washington metropolitan area and Baltimore City. Maryland has not seen a Republican presidential candidate win its votes since 1988, and the state has not been within 15% since 2004; Hillary Clinton won the state by 26 points over Donald Trump (60% to 34%) in 2016, Barack Obama defeated Mitt Romney by 26 points in 2012 (62% to 36%), and Obama defeated John McCain by 25 points in 2008 (62% to 37%).

Hogan was elected governor in 2014, defeating then-lieutenant governor Anthony Brown by a margin of 51–47; the result was considered one of the biggest election upsets that year. Prior to Hogan's victory, Bob Ehrlich, elected in 2002, had been the only Republican elected as Governor of Maryland since Spiro Agnew. However, Ehrlich was defeated for reelection in 2006 by Martin O'Malley and defeated again in 2010, when he faced O'Malley in a rematch.

In April 2018, Hogan had a 68% approval rating, the second-highest approval of any governor in the country, only behind Governor Charlie Baker of Massachusetts, who had a 71% approval rating. Despite the state's Democratic leaning, Hogan had a high approval rating among all partisan groups (65% approval from Democrats, 64% of Independents, and 81% of Republicans).

Republican primary

Candidates

Nominated
 Larry Hogan, incumbent governor

Declined
 Barry Glassman, Harford County Executive
 John Grasso, Anne Arundel County Councilman

Endorsements

Results

Democratic primary

Candidates

Nominated
 Ben Jealous, former president and CEO of the NAACP
 Running mate: Susie Turnbull, former chair of the Maryland Democratic Party and former vice chair of the Democratic National Committee

Eliminated in primary
 Rushern Baker, Prince George's County executive
 Running mate: Elizabeth Embry, former Maryland Attorney General Crime Division Chief and candidate for Mayor of Baltimore in 2016
 Ralph Jaffe, perennial candidate
 Running mate: Freda Jaffe, sister of Ralph Jaffe
 James Jones II
 Running mate: Charles Waters
 Richard Madaleno, State Senator
 Running mate: Luwanda Jenkins, businesswoman and former Maryland Special Secretary for Minority Affairs
 Alec Ross, author and former State Department official
 Running mate: Julie Verratti, co-founder of Denziens Brewing Co, former senior advisor at the Small Business Administration, and LGBT political activist.
 Jim Shea, attorney
 Running mate: Brandon Scott, Baltimore City Councilmember
 Krishanti O'Mara Vignarajah, former policy director to former First Lady Michelle Obama and former State Department official
 Running mate: Sharon Blake, former president of the Baltimore Teachers Union

Deceased
 Kevin Kamenetz, Baltimore County Executive (deceased May 10, 2018)
 Running mate: Valerie Ervin, senior advisor to the Working Families Party and former Montgomery County Councilmember
 (Because of Kamenetz' death, Valerie Ervin became a candidate for governor. See under "Withdrew" heading for more information.)

Withdrew
 Maya Rockeymoore Cummings, policy consultant and wife of U.S. Representative Elijah Cummings
 Valerie Ervin, former senior advisor to the Working Families Party and former Montgomery County Councilmember
 Running mate: Marisol Johnson, former vice chair of the Baltimore County Board of Education and small businesswoman
 (Valerie Ervin, who had been the running mate of Kevin Kamenetz before he died on May 10, became a candidate for governor with Marisol Johnson as running mate on May 17. This came too late to change the primary ballot, so notices were posted at polling places informing voters that votes for Kamenetz and Ervin would be counted as votes for Ervin and Johnson. On June 12, Ervin withdrew from the race.)

Declined
 John Delaney, U.S. Representative (ran for President in 2020,)
 Peter Franchot, State Comptroller
 Brian Frosh, Attorney General
 Doug Gansler, former attorney general and candidate for governor in 2014
 Ike Leggett, Montgomery County executive
 Maggie McIntosh, state delegate
 Thomas Perez, chair of the Democratic National Committee, former United States Secretary of Labor, and former Maryland Secretary of Labor
 Stephanie Rawlings-Blake, former mayor of Baltimore
 David Trone, businessman and candidate for MD-08 in 2016 (running for MD-06)
 Heather Mizeur, former state delegate and candidate for governor in 2014
 Joseline Peña-Melnyk, state delegate and candidate for MD-04 in 2016
 Kenneth Ulman, former Howard County executive and nominee for lieutenant governor in 2014

Endorsements

Polling

Results

Green nomination

Candidates

Declared
 Ian Schlakman, entrepreneur and former co-chair of the Maryland Green Party
 Running mate: Annie Chambers, reverend and Baltimore City Resident Advisory Board Member

Results
Following the Maryland Green Party's nominating procedure, the delegates of the Coordinating Council, which is the party's State Central Committee, made the decision to nominate the gubernatorial ticket as no other candidate had filed by the party's March 30, 2018, deadline. More than one ticket seeking the nomination would have required the party to conduct a primary, an obligation not mandated by the State Board of Elections for non-principal parties.

Libertarian convention

Candidates

Declared
 Shawn Quinn, nominee for governor in 2014 and nominee for the House of Delegates in 2010
 Running mate: Christina Smith

General election

Debates
Larry Hogan and Ben Jealous met for their one and only scheduled debate on September 24. The debate was livestreamed in the evening by the Maryland Public Television.

Predictions

Polling

with Rushern Baker

with Richard Madaleno

with Alec Ross

with Jim Shea

with Krish Vignarajah

with Valerie Ervin

with Kevin Kamenetz

with John Delaney

with Tom Perez

Results

Results by congressional district
Hogan carried 6 of 8 congressional districts, including 5 held by Democrats. This included the district of then-House Minority Whip Steny Hoyer, which Hogan lost to Hoyer in 1992.

See also
Governor of Maryland
List of governors of Maryland
Maryland gubernatorial elections
Primary elections in Maryland
Maryland elections
2014 Maryland gubernatorial election
2018 Maryland House of Delegates election
2018 Maryland Senate election
Maryland Senate
Maryland House of Delegates

References

External links
 Candidates at Vote Smart
 Candidates at Ballotpedia

Official campaign websites
 Larry Hogan (R) for Governor
 Ben Jealous (D) for Governor
 Shawn Quinn (L) for Governor
 Ian Schlakman (G) for Governor

Gubernatorial
2018
Maryland